Alicia Ely Yamin teaches at Harvard University and is a Senior Fellow at the Petrie-Flom Center for Health Law Policy, Biotechnology and Bioethics at Harvard Law School as well as an adjunct senior lecturer at the Harvard TH Chan School of Public Health. She is also a Senior Advisor at Partners In Health.Yamin’s career has combined fieldwork, advocacy and scholarship in relation to health-related rights.

In 2016, the UN Secretary General appointed Yamin as one of ten international experts to the Independent Accountability Panel (IAP) for the Global Strategy on Women's, Children's and Adolescents' Health in the Sustainable Development Goals.

Yamin has served on numerous WHO and UN advisory groups and committees, and has advised high courts around the world in relation to health rights cases. She was chair of the board of the Center for Economic and Social Rights from 2009-15, and currently serves on the Board of Directors of Women in Global Health.

From 2016-18, Yamin was a Visiting Professor at Georgetown University Law Center. Prior to that she held positions as Policy Director of the Francois-Xavier-Bagnoud Center for Health and Human Rights at Harvard University, and Director of Research and Investigations at Physicians for Human Rights.

Yamin has received various distinctions and awards in relation to her work, including the Joseph H Flom Fellowship in Global Health and Human Rights at Harvard Law School and the Gladstein Distinguished Visiting Professorship at the University of Connecticut.

Education
Yamin is a graduate of Harvard College, Harvard Law School and the Harvard TH Chan School of Public Health. She also earned a PhD in law from the Universidad de Buenos Aires. 

Yamin began her career in health and human rights at the Mailman School of Public Health at Columbia University, where she worked with the Averting Maternal Death and Disability Program on maternal and reproductive health. Her work has continued to focus on reproductive justice, the enforceability of health rights, and on the intersections of global health, development and human rights law.

References

Harvard Law School faculty
American officials of the United Nations
Year of birth missing (living people)
Living people
Harvard College alumni
Harvard Law School alumni
Harvard School of Public Health alumni
Harvard School of Public Health faculty